I'm with Stupid is a British television programme starring Paul Henshall and Mark Benton.

The series was created by BBC Comedy North. Peter Keeley was series consultant and it was written by Daniel Peak. The original pilot episode aired on BBC Three in March 2005.

The main character, Paul, portrayed by disabled actor Paul Henshall, has cerebral palsy and Mark Benton's character, Sheldon, is a homeless man who Paul takes in to Bramble Lodge and offers him a place to stay. Bramble Lodge is a home for disabled people governed by Jean (portrayed by Ruth Jones).  The cast also includes Alan Martin as Graham, Kevin Davids as Syd, Cherylee Houston as Dorothy and Steve Edge as Sergeant Swithenback. The series aired from 10 September to 15 October 2006 on BBC Three.

References

External links
 British Sitcom Guide
 

2000s British sitcoms
2006 British television series debuts
2006 British television series endings
BBC television sitcoms
Works about cerebral palsy and other paralytic syndromes